Syed Dulal is a Bangladeshi theatre artist and television actor who has introduced studio theatre in Bangladesh. As of 21 December 2012 he had directed 851 theatre plays. He is also known for portraying "Guni Moyra" in Sisimpur.

Awards
 Abul Kashem Dulal Memorial Medal
 Nandonik Natyajon Award
 Palakar First Anniversary Award

References

Year of birth missing (living people)
People from Barisal District
Bangladeshi male television actors
Living people